Man of Vendetta is a 2010 South Korean film about a pastor whose life changes after the abduction of his daughter.

Um Ki-joon was nominated for Best New Actor in Film at the 47th Baeksang Arts Awards in 2011.

Plot
Joo Young-soo (Kim Myung-min) is a devoted Christian and well-respected pastor whose 5-year-old daughter, Hye-rin (Kim So-hyun), gets kidnapped. The story starts with Young-soo attempting to give the kidnapper the ransom money in exchange for his daughter in an ice hockey rink, but because of his wife, Min-kyung's (Park Joo-mi) interference by informing the police, the kidnapper doesn't show. Eight years later, Young-soo loses his faith in God and leaves the church while his wife is still desperately searching for their daughter. He opens up a business and mocks his wife for not losing hope. He soon receives a call from the kidnapper, saying his daughter is still alive and they're asking for more ransom money, demanding that there be no police this time. Now given another chance to save his daughter, he takes matters into his own hands.

Cast
Kim Myung-min ... Joo Young-soo 
Um Ki-joon ... Choi Byeong-chul 
Kim So-hyun ... Joo Hye-rin 
Park Joo-mi ... Park Min-kyung 
Lee Byung-joon  ... Detective Koo 
Oh Kwang-rok - GPS technician
Kim Eung-soo - corrupt hospital chief Kim
Min Bok-gi - delivery man
Lee Ho-jae - Mr. No (audiophile selling expensive amp)
Lee Jang-won - fat boss (Byeong-chul's boss)

References

External links
  
 
 
 

Films about child abduction
South Korean films about revenge
2010 films
South Korean crime thriller films
Films directed by Woo Min-ho
2010s South Korean films